United Nations Security Council Resolution 2041 was unanimously adopted on 22 March 2012.

See also 
List of United Nations Security Council Resolutions 2001 to 2100

References

External links
Text of the Resolution at undocs.org

2012 United Nations Security Council resolutions
United Nations Security Council resolutions concerning Afghanistan
2012 in Afghanistan
March 2012 events